Diana Cortesina (Madrid, 1928 - Madrid, 22 May 2011) was a Spanish actress and vedette, who worked extensively in Argentina. She was raised in a family of artists, her father being the actor Roberto Fugazot, a member of the  trio "Irusta-Fugazot-Demare". When she was very 

young, Cortesina emigrated to Argentina fleeing the Spanish Civil War. Her sister was the actress and film director, Helena Cortesina.

Filmography
 Milagro de amor (1946)
 The Sin of Julia (1946)
 Un día perdido (1954)

References

External links
 
 Diana Cortesina at Cinenacional

1928 births
2011 deaths
Spanish film actresses
Spanish vedettes
Spanish emigrants to Argentina
20th-century Spanish actresses
Actresses from Madrid